The 2004 European Parliament election for the election of the delegation from the Netherlands was held on 10 June 2004.
This is the 6th time the elections have been held for the European elections in the Netherlands.

Sources for everything below:

Numbering of the candidates list 
The official order and names of candidate lists: 

| colspan="6" | 
|-
! style="background-color:#E9E9E9;text-align:center;vertical-align:top;" colspan=5 | Lists
|-
!style="background-color:#E9E9E9;text-align:center;" colspan="3"|List
!style="background-color:#E9E9E9;| English translation
!style="background-color:#E9E9E9;| List name (Dutch)
|-
| 1
| 
| style="text-align:left;" | list
| style="text-align:left;" | CDA - European People's Party
| style="text-align:left;" | CDA – Europese Volkspartij

|-
| 2
| 
| style="text-align:left;" | list
| style="text-align:left;" | P.v.d.A./European Social Democrats
| style="text-align:left;" | P.v.d.A./Europese Sociaaldemocraten

|-
| 3
| 
| style="text-align:left;" | list
| style="text-align:left;" | VVD - European Liberal-Democrats
| style="text-align:left;" | VVD – Europese Liberaal-Democraten

|-
| 4
| 
| style="text-align:left;" | list
| style="text-align:left;" | GREENLEFT
| style="text-align:left;" | GROENLINKS

|-
| 5
| 
| style="text-align:left;" | list
| style="text-align:left;" | Christian Union-SGP
| style="text-align:left;" | ChristenUnie–SGP

|-
| 6
| 
| style="text-align:left;" | list
| style="text-align:left;" | Democrats 66 (D66)
| style="text-align:left;" | Democraten 66 (D66)

|-
| 7
| 
| style="text-align:left;" | list
| style="text-align:left;" | SP (Socialist Party)
| style="text-align:left;" | SP (Socialistische Partij)

|-
| 8
| 
| style="text-align:left;" | list
| style="text-align:left;" | Democratic Europe
| style="text-align:left;" | Democratisch Europa

|-
| 9
| 
| style="text-align:left;" | list
| style="text-align:left;" | LIVABLE EUROPE
| style="text-align:left;" | LEEFBAAR EUROPA

|-
| 10
| 
| style="text-align:left;" | list
| style="text-align:left;" | Party for the North
| style="text-align:left;" | Partij voor het Noorden

|-
| 11
| 
| style="text-align:left;" | list
| style="text-align:left;" | New Right
| style="text-align:left;" | Nieuw Rechts

|-
| 12
| 
| style="text-align:left;" | list
| style="text-align:left;" | Europe Transparent
| style="text-align:left;" | Europa Transparant

|-
| 13
| 
| style="text-align:left;" | list
| style="text-align:left;" | List Pim Fortuyn (LPF)
| style="text-align:left;" | Lijst Pim Fortuyn (LPF)

|-
| 14
| 
| style="text-align:left;" | list
| style="text-align:left;" | Party for the Animals
| style="text-align:left;" | Partij voor de Dieren

|-
| 15
| 
| style="text-align:left;" | list
| style="text-align:left;" | Respect.now
| style="text-align:left;" | Respect.Nu

|-
|}

Candidate lists

CDA - European People's Party 

Below is the candidate list for the Christian Democratic Appeal for the 2004 European Parliament election

Elected members are in bold

P.v.d.A./European Social Democrats 

Below is the candidate list for the Labour Party for the 2004 European Parliament election

Elected members are in bold

VVD - European Liberal-Democrats 

Below is the candidate list for the People's Party for Freedom and Democracy for the 2004 European Parliament election

Elected members are in bold

GreenLeft 

Below is the candidate list for GreenLeft for the 2004 European Parliament election

Elected members are in bold

Christian Union-SGP 

Below is the candidate list for Christian Union-SGP for the 2004 European Parliament election

Elected members are in bold

Democrats 66 (D66) 

Below is the candidate list for the Democrats 66 for the 2004 European Parliament election

Elected members are in bold

SP (Socialist Party) 

Below is the candidate list for Socialist Party for the 2004 European Parliament election

Elected members are in bold

Democratic Europe 
Below is the candidate list for the Democratic Europe for the 2004 European Parliament election

Livable Europe 
Below is the candidate list for the Livable Europe for the 2004 European Parliament election

Party for the North 
Below is the candidate list for Party for the North for the 2004 European Parliament election

New Right 
Below is the candidate list for New Right for the 2004 European Parliament election

Europe Transparent 
Below is the candidate list for Europe Transparent for the 2004 European Parliament election

Elected members are in bold

List Pim Fortuyn (LPF) 
Below is the candidate list for the List Pim Fortuyn for the 2004 European Parliament election

Party for the Animals 

Below is the candidate list for Party for the Animals for the 2004 European Parliament election

Respect.now 
Below is the candidate list for the Respect.now for the 2004 European Parliament election

References

2004
Netherlands